Gunar is a surname. Notable people with the surname include:

 Gunar Kirchbach (born 1971), German sprint canoer
 B. Gunar Gruenke, stained glass artist in Wisconsin
 Nedim Günar (1932–2011), Turkish football defender

See also
 Gunars
 Gunnar